Subsurface is the seventh studio album by British progressive metal band Threshold. It is the last album to feature founding member and guitarist Nick Midson. The album was released in August 2004, and received an Album of the Month award in several European music magazines.

Songs on the album resume themes from earlier albums, including environmentalism and war, but also incorporating political themes.

Reception
In 2005, Subsurface was ranked number 472 in Rock Hard magazine's book of The 500 Greatest Rock & Metal Albums of All Time.

Track listing

Personnel 
Steve Anderson – bass guitar
Karl Groom – rhythm and solo guitar
Johanne James – drums
Andrew "Mac" McDermott – vocals
Nick Midson – rhythm guitar
Richard West – keyboards

References

2004 albums
Threshold (band) albums
Inside Out Music albums
Albums produced by Karl Groom